Dicranodontium is a genus of mosses belonging to the family Dicranaceae.

The genus was first described by Bruch and Wilhelm Philippe Schimper.

The genus has cosmopolitan distribution.

Species:
 Dicranodontium denudatum Britton, 1913

References

Moss genera
Dicranales